Il Tallone di Achille is a 1952 Italian comedy film.

Cast
 
Tino Scotti as Cav. Achille Rosso
Tamara Lees as 	Sonia
Paolo Stoppa as  	Lo Strozzino Serafino
Titina De Filippo as 	Cantoniera di Roma
Lauro Gazzolo as  	Ing, Felix
Marisa Merlini as  	Zizì
Aroldo Tieri as  	Pazzo della Reincarnazione
Loris Gizzi as 	Psicanalista Gregorius
Renato Malavasi as 	Uff. di Stato Civile 
Luigi Pavese as 	Dott. Paridi
Nino Pavese as 	Bandito Risciotta
Pina Piovani as  	Madre della Bambina
Tecla Scarano as  	Stella Piccola 
Xenia Valderi as 	La Giornalista
Primo Carnera as  himself

External links
 

1952 films
1950s Italian-language films
Films directed by Mario Amendola
Italian comedy films
1952 comedy films
Italian black-and-white films
1950s Italian films